In mathematics, George Glauberman's ZJ theorem states that if a finite group G is p-constrained and p-stable and has a normal p-subgroup for some odd prime p, then Op′(G)Z(J(S)) is a normal subgroup of G, for any Sylow p-subgroup S.

Notation and definitions
J(S) is the Thompson subgroup of a p-group S: the subgroup generated by the abelian subgroups of maximal order.
Z(H) means the center of a group H.
Op′ is the maximal normal subgroup of G of order coprime to p, the p′-core
Op is the maximal normal p-subgroup of G, the p-core.
Op′,p(G) is the maximal normal p-nilpotent subgroup of G, the p′,p-core, part of the upper p-series.
For an odd prime p, a group G with Op(G) ≠ 1 is said to be p-stable if whenever P is a p-subgroup of G such that POp′(G) is normal in G, and [P,x,x] = 1, then the image of x in NG(P)/CG(P) is contained in a normal p-subgroup of NG(P)/CG(P).
For an odd prime p, a group G with Op(G) ≠ 1 is said to be p-constrained if the centralizer CG(P) is contained in Op′,p(G) whenever P is a Sylow p-subgroup of Op′,p(G).

References
 
 
 

Theorems about finite groups